Verkhnyaya Mityukovka is a rural locality (a khutor) in Tenyayevsky Selsoviet, Fyodorovsky District, Bashkortostan, Russia. The population was 3 in 2010. There is one street.

Geography 
Verkhnyaya Mityukovka is located 12 km northwest of Fyodorovka (the district's administrative centre) by road. Aytugan-Durasovo is the nearest rural locality.

References 

Rural localities in Fyodorovsky District